The following is a list of episodes of Bizarre, a Canadian sketch comedy television series that aired from 1980 to 1986 on CTV in Canada, and in the United States on the Showtime premium cable network. Impressionist John Byner was the host of Bizarre, often joined by Bob Einstein, often playing the roles of the show's producer, and stuntman Super Dave Osborne. Much of the humour on the show was considered risque during the original run of the series, especially on episodes seen on Showtime, due to more-relaxed programming standards.

Season one (1980–1981)

Season two (1981–1982)

Season three (1982–1983)

Season four (1983–1984)

Season five (1984–1985)

Season six (1985–1986)

References

External links
 

Lists of Canadian comedy television series episodes